Aynaghar or House of Horros is the name of a secret detention centre run by the Directorate General of Forces Intelligence (DGFI), Bangladesh's defence forces' intelligence branch.

Incident
On August 14, 2022, Netra News, a Sweden-based independent news portal, published an investigative whistleblower report alleging that Bangladesh officials were detaining and torturing victims of enforced disappearances at Aynaghar (house of mirrors).

The Sweden-based news portal also revealed the possible location of the secret prison, where victims of enforced disappearances are believed to be held in Bangladesh. The detailed report by Netra News was based on the on-the-record accounts of two victims of enforced disappearances, Hasinur Rahman and Sheikh Mohammad Salim, who say they were held inside the prison situated in the heart of Dhaka.

Photos of the prison cells were also published, which the news site claimed were provided by active-duty military officers.

Description
It is alleged that the Counter-terrorism Intelligence Bureau (CTIB) of DGFI is responsible for the maintenance of the detention center. There are at least 16 rooms with the capacity of holding around 30 detainees at a time. The site is believed to be situated inside the Dhaka Cantonment area of Bangladesh.

List of Secret Prisoners

It is believed  that the following persons were detained at the secret detention facility:
 Mubashar Hasan, an academic who was formerly a professor with North South University
 Maruf Zaman, a former ambassador 
 Aniruddha Kumar Roy, a businessman

The following are believed  to be still detained at the facility:
 Mir Ahmad Bin Quasem, a Bangladeshi barrister and son of Jamaat-e-Islami leader Mir Quasem Ali
 Abdullahil Amaan Azmi, a former military general and the son of Jamaat-e-Islami leader Ghulam Azam

Reactions

The Netra News report came on the eve of UN human rights chief Michelle Bachelet's four-day visit to Bangladesh, where she met with several ministers in Dhaka about widespread allegations of state-sanctioned disappearances. In a departure press conference on August 17, the UN human rights chief stated that there are ongoing, alarming allegations of both short-term and long-term enforced disappearances, as well as concerns about a lack of due process and judicial safeguards, and urged the government to establish an impartial, independent, and transparent investigation into allegations of extrajudicial killing, torture, and enforced disappearances.

Meenakshi Ganguly of Human Rights Watch, in a statement urged the Bangladesh government "to take the first step toward accountability” by holding the perpetrators responsible for enforced disappearance. Bangladesh government officials have dismissed the claims regarding Aynaghar as false and concocted.

Mayer Daak, a platform of families of enforced disappearance victims, organised a rally in support of UN High Commissioner for Human Rights Michelle Bachelet's call for an impartial, independent, and transparent investigation into allegations of enforced disappearance, extrajudicial killing, and torture during her visit to Bangladesh. Its convener, Sanjida Islam, criticised the DGFI for allegedly establishing a secret detention centre and demanded the immediate release of those detained.

A leading newspaper, The Daily Star, has suggested that there may be several other such torture and detention sites in various locations of the country.

See Also
 Enforced disappearances in Bangladesh
 Netra News
 Human rights in Bangladesh
 Mir Ahmad Bin Quasem
 Abdullahil Amaan Azmi

References

Enforced disappearances in Bangladesh
Black sites
Counterterrorism in Bangladesh
Human rights abuses in Bangladesh
Torture in Bangladesh